Mosport Grand Prix may refer to:

 Grand Prix of Mosport, IMSA GT prototype sports car race at Mosport
 Canadian Grand Prix, in the 1970s, Formula 1 grand prix
 Canadian motorcycle Grand Prix, in the 1960s, MotoGP grand prix